Ronifibrate is a fibrate, a hypolipidemic agent. It is a combined ester of clofibric acid and niacin (nicotinic acid) with 1,3-propanediol. In the body, the ester is split to 1,3-propanediol and both acids which work in the same way, lowering lipids in blood.

References

2-Methyl-2-phenoxypropanoic acid derivatives
Prodrugs
Chloroarenes
Nicotinate esters